Order of the Geoduck is an international award issued by the International Rogaining Federation for long-term high level contributions to international rogaining. The award takes the form of a replica geoduck, a saltwater clam found on the Pacific coast of North America.

Geoduck Awardees have been:
 1994 Carl Moore (United States) 
 1995 Keg Good (USA) 
 1996 Eric Smith (USA) 
 1997 Wilkey Richardson (USA) 
 1998 Murray Foubister (Canada) 
 1999 Michael Haynes (Canada) 
 2000 Michael Wood (New Zealand) 
 2001 Peg Davis (USA) 
 2002 Neil Phillips (Australia) 
 2003 Rod Phillips (Australia) 
 2004 John Maier (USA) 
 2005 Andres Käär (Estonia) 
 2006 Mal Harding (USA) 
 2006 Alan Mansfield (Australia) 
 2006 Mike Sheridan (New Zealand) 
 2007 Francis Falardeau (Quebec, Canada)
 2008 Peter Taylor (Australia)
 2008 Peter Squires (New Zealand)
 2010 Bill Kennedy (New Zealand) 
 2010 Derek Morris (Australia)
 2012 Lauri Leppik (Estonia)
 2012 Bob Reddick (USA)
 2014 Efim Shtempler (Ukraine)
 2016 Sergey Yashchenko (Russia)
 2020 Jan Tojnar (Czech Republic)
 2020 Richard Robinson (Australia)

Sources

Navigation
Outdoor recreation organizations
Sports trophies and awards